Viktoriya Georgieva (born 21 September 1997), known professionally by the mononym Victoria (stylised in all caps), is a Bulgarian singer and songwriter. She began her career after participating in season four of X Factor Bulgaria.
Georgieva would have represented Bulgaria at the Eurovision Song Contest 2020 in Rotterdam, with her song "Tears Getting Sober". Due to the 2020 contest's cancellation, Georgieva represented Bulgaria at the Eurovision Song Contest 2021 instead, this time with "Growing Up Is Getting Old".

Life and career 

Georgieva started singing at age of eleven. After some time she enrolled in the vocal studio "Angel Voices" where her music teacher was Atanaska Lipcheva. Georgieva auditioned for the first 3 seasons of The X Factor Bulgaria, but she never made it past the judges, mostly because of her age.

2015: The X Factor Bulgaria
In September 2015, at the fourth season of The X Factor, after three attempts, Georgieva finally made it past the judges and to the live shows. She entered the females team mentored by the rapper Krisko. She remained on the show until week nine, when she was eliminated and ultimately placed sixth.

2016–2018: Debut single and various record deals
Despite failing to win The X Factor, Georgieva received an offer to join Virginia Records, which she declined. Instead, in 2016, she joined MonteMusic and released her first single titled "Nishto Sluchayno", accompanied with a music video directed by Bashmotion and featured VenZy and Niki Bakalov. She then released two other songs with MonteMusic, “Nezavurshen Roman” in 2016 and “Chast ot Men” in 2017. After mutual conflicts, Georgieva left the label in late 2017.

In 2018, Georgieva spent ten days in Los Angeles, California, where she wrote and filmed her first English song “I Wanna Know”, released in June 2019, with a music video directed by Dimitry Stefanov, and produced by Velina Ilieva.

2019–present: Eurovision and international debut
On 25 November 2019, it was revealed that Georgieva, now using the mononym Victoria, would represent Bulgaria in the Eurovision Song Contest 2020. She and her sponsor Ligna Group created the song “Tears Getting Sober“, which tells about the inner difficulties in the people, a topic which is very close to Georgieva. Due to the COVID-19 pandemic, the 2020 contest was cancelled, and Georgieva was later retained as the Bulgarian act for the following year's contest.

In June 2020, Georgieva released her new song titled “Alright”. The song was created at one of the Eurovision songwriting camps and carries a message of hope and a new beginning. A few weeks later, in August, she and her team spent ten days in a Eurovision song writing camp held in Burgas and Primorsko, where they managed to create a few potential songs that she could use. In November, she released her third single "Ugly Cry".

In January 2021, Georgieva announced that she would release her debut extended play, titled A Little Dramatic, in February. The project includes five potential songs that could represent Bulgaria at the Eurovision Song Contest 2021. The EP does not include the single "Ugly Cry", however, the song was considered as a potential song to represent Bulgaria. The lead single from the EP, "Imaginary Friend", was released on 14 February. On 11 March, it was announced during a pre-recorded concert premiered on YouTube that the song Victoria would perform is "Growing Up Is Getting Old".

She performed in the second semi-final, where she qualified to the final on 22 May 2021. Ultimately, she received 170 points, finishing 11th.

On 4 December 2021, Georgieva won the third season of The Masked Singer Bulgaria as “Miss”.

Discography

Extended plays

Singles

Promotional singles

Notes

References

External links 
 

1997 births
Living people
Musicians from Varna, Bulgaria
21st-century Bulgarian women singers
X Factor (Bulgarian TV series)
Masked Singer winners
Eurovision Song Contest entrants for Bulgaria
Eurovision Song Contest entrants of 2020
Eurovision Song Contest entrants of 2021
Bulgarian pop musicians